Rezső Riheczky (1933 – 31 March 1993) was a Hungarian rower. Riheczky was born in 1933 in Budapest. His father, János Riheczky, represented Hungary at the 1936 Olympics in wrestling.

Riheczky Jr. competed at the 1952 Summer Olympics in Helsinki with the men's eight where they were eliminated in the semi-finals repêchage.

References

External links
 

1933 births
1993 deaths
Hungarian male rowers
Olympic rowers of Hungary
Rowers at the 1952 Summer Olympics
Rowers at the 1956 Summer Olympics
Rowers from Budapest
European Rowing Championships medalists